In enzymology, a glycine-oxaloacetate transaminase is an enzyme that catalyzes the chemical reaction

glycine + oxaloacetate  glyoxylate + L-aspartate

Thus, the two substrates of this enzyme are glycine and oxaloacetate, whereas its two products are glyoxylate and L-aspartate.

This enzyme belongs to the family of transferases, specifically the transaminases, which transfer nitrogenous groups.  The systematic name of this enzyme class is glycine:oxaloacetate aminotransferase. This enzyme is also called glycine-oxaloacetate aminotransferase.  It employs one cofactor, pyridoxal phosphate.

References

 

EC 2.6.1
Pyridoxal phosphate enzymes
Enzymes of unknown structure